Brandigo China is registered in Shanghai, China, and provides brand strategy and marketing communications services in Greater China. Its head office is in Shanghai, China with a sister office in Boston, USA. The company, formerly Adsmith China, re-branded in 2017 to become Brandigo China. Brandigo China works across many industries, with a strong expertise in B2B marketing and communications.

Brandigo China is one of the few independent marketing and communication agencies in Shanghai. Brandigo China was founded by American Michael Golden in 2004. Golden is a graduate of Cornell University and holds an MBA from the UC Berkeley Haas School of Business. Brandigo China is the only China representative of the E3 Agency Network, a global marketing communications network of the world's top independent agencies.

The company started business in graphic design, branding and market research, and added the public relations unit in 2005. In 2008 Adsmith added the Interactive PR (digital) unit. Brandigo China developed the public relations business from 2005-2009. In 2014 the company developed content creation and inbound content marketing as core services, along with an internal communications consultancy. The company moved from its headquarters in InFactory to new offices in Anken Green in the Jing'an District of Shanghai in January 2010. Golden was dubbed the "Branding King of Shanghai" by City Weekend Shanghai in 2010. The company works with many Shanghai-based partners. Brandigo is a member of the PRCA and abides by their professional conduct standards for communication agencies. 

Golden has worked to promote general marketing and communication services in Shanghai through various activities, including a speech for the Australian Chamber of Commerce, and a book review in the peer-edited International Journal of Advertising. Brandigo China also published the CMOs Guide to China Marketing podcast.

Core Services
Communications Consulting 
Content Creation
Social Media Marketing
PR/Media Relations
Digital Experiences
Demand generation and brand awareness campaigns

Associated Services
Website & Video Direction

External links
 Brandigo China Official site
 British Chamber of Commerce Créative Directory

References

Chinese companies established in 2003
Marketing companies established in 2003
Companies based in Shanghai